Borusa is a fictional character in the series Doctor Who, a member of the race of Time Lords from Gallifrey. Within the context of the series, Borusa is a former teacher of the Doctor who appears in four serials. Notably, Borusa was portrayed by a different actor in each appearance, it being implied that the character had regenerated.

Backstory

In The Deadly Assassin, it is established that Borusa is a member of the Prydonian Chapter and is said to have taught the Doctor in the Prydon Academy.

It is further revealed in The Invasion of Time that Borusa taught mind shielding, among other subjects, and had written a paper on reason.

His past on Gallifrey is expanded upon in spin-off media. In the Past Doctor Adventures novel Divided Loyalties, Borusa is revealed to have taught the Deca, ten brilliant academy students including the Doctor, the Master, the Meddling Monk, the Rani, Drax, the War Chief, Vansell, Rallon, Millenia and Jelpax.

In the Virgin Missing Adventures novel Goth Opera, it is said that Borusa was the subject of practical jokes from the Doctor and his friend Ruath. These jokes included the electrification of Borusa's "perigosto stick".

In the Virgin New Adventures novel Cat's Cradle: Time's Crucible, Borusa is said to have written a history entitled "Rassilon the God".

Appearances

The character is introduced in The Deadly Assassin, in which he is portrayed by Angus MacKay. He occupies the post of Cardinal, holding the degree of jurist, and is portrayed as an amoral political pragmatist, a ready player in the elitist society of the Time Lords. A spin-doctor, he is shown to be ready to "adjust the truth" to "maintain public confidence in the Time Lords and their leadership".

Borusa appears again, having illegally become Lord Chancellor, when the Doctor returns to Gallifrey briefly in The Invasion of Time, portrayed by John Arnatt.

By the time of Arc of Infinity, Borusa has regenerated again and has officially become Lord President of Gallifrey. He is scapegoated for Councillor Hedin's crimes, though he later clears his name. This incarnation is portrayed by Leonard Sachs.

In The Five Doctors, Borusa has once again regenerated, now portrayed by Philip Latham, and is dissatisfied with ruling Gallifrey. Desiring the secret of "perpetual regeneration" from Rassilon, he restarts the Game of Rassilon, using the Timescoop to have the Doctors and their companions play it for him. Borusa is given a horrible kind of immortality, immobilised as a living statue.

Other appearances

In the Virgin New Adventures novel Blood Harvest, Borusa is freed by the renegade Committee of Three but aids the Seventh Doctor, Rassilon and Romana in defeating them.

In the Eighth Doctor Adventures novel The Eight Doctors, Borusa's noblest incarnation is released from Rassilon's tomb thanks to the appeal of the Eighth Doctor to help resolve the political conflict inspired by the Sixth Doctor's trial in The Trial of a Time Lord. Borusa then deposes the corrupt High Council and arranges honest elections. After this he returns to his Tomb, not feeling redeemed.

Borusa appears in the Past Doctor Adventures novel Warmonger as a Junior Cardinal assisting Acting President Saran. In the same story, Borusa is one of three Time Lords on the tribunal trying former Lord President Morbius.

In the novel Engines of War by George Mann, Rassilon has resurrected Borusa in order to use him as a possibility engine to calculate possible future outcomes of key decisions in the Time War. He is stolen by the War Doctor and is killed in the process of helping him when he destroys all the Daleks in the Tantalus Eye.

Borusa will make his first Big Finish audio appearance in April 2022, played by Sanjeev Bhaskar, for a story in the Doctor Who Unbound range - Doctor of War: Genesis - which takes place in an alternate timeline.

List of appearances

Television
The Deadly Assassin
The Invasion of Time
Arc of Infinity
The Five Doctors

Novels
Warmonger
Blood Harvest
The Eight Doctors
Engines of War

References

Television characters introduced in 1976
Male characters in television
Recurring characters in Doctor Who
Time Lords